Jiang Ziya (sometimes spelt as Jiang Zi Ya) is a 2020 Chinese 3D computer-animated fantasy adventure film  directed by Cheng Teng and Li Wei. Featuring the mythological and fictional version of the popular Chinese figure Jiang Ziya, the plot is loosely based on the novel Investiture of the Gods by Xu Zhonglin. It is a follow-up to 2019's Ne Zha and the second installment of the Fengshen Cinematic Universe.

The film was initially scheduled for release in China on 25 January 2020, but following the COVID-19 pandemic all Chinese New Year releases were cancelled. The new release date was on 1 October 2020. The film's official English title in China is Legend of Deification, and it is released as Jiang Ziya: Legend of Deification in the United Kingdom, Australia, New Zealand, and Singapore.

Plot 
After a Fox spirit causes the downfall of the Shang dynasty, A war is waged across the three realms. Eventually, the Fox spirit is captured. Jiang Ziya, a mortal who has gained renown via the war, is given the job of executing it. During the execution, the fox spirit shows Jiang Ziya that there is a young girl inside of her, and that going through with the execution would kill the girl as well. Jiang Ziya hesitates to continue the process but seemingly kills the fox spirit after it tries to escape. Unwilling to accept that the girl was supposedly an illusion created by the fox spirit, Jiang Ziya is stripped of his powers and banished to the North Sea until he can correct his mind.

Jiang spends ten years on earth despondent with his friend Shen Gongbao and his pet, Si Bu Xiang. Jiang encounters Xiao Jiu, an amnesiac young fox spirit who resembles the girl he saw during the fox spirit's execution. After a scuffle over a map, Jiang Ziya decides to accompany her to Youdu Mountain, where she believes her father is waiting for her, trailed by Shen Gongbao. During the journey, Jiang Ziya fights numerous dark demons- both evil fox spirits and the souls of the lost. At Youdu mountain, Xiao Jiu encounters the King of Zhou, who explains that she is tied to the original fox spirit and must be killed in order to fully defeat the former. Upon hearing this, Jiang Ziya attempts to kill her but inadvertently summons the fox spirit. She explains that the girl was Su Daji and was abandoned by her father to be given as a concubine.

Jiang Ziya along with Shen Gongbao manage to fight off the fox spirit together, at the cost of the death of Si Bu Xiang. Shen Gongbao decides to sacrifice some of his power to spirit Jiang to the heavens, so he may speak to the Master, Yuanshi Tianzun. The Master explains that Jiang Ziya wasn't denied Godhood because he didn't kill the fox clan leader but because he was willing to risk the fate of the world to save the girl. Jiang Ziya convinces the Master to let him guide the girl to reincarnation, which would kill the fox spirit.

Jiang Ziya takes Xiao Jiu to the Gate of Reincarnation, the fox spirit being held back by Shen Gongbao- however, the fox spirit manages to get past him and attack the gate. As the fox spirit regains her power, she explains to Jiang Ziya that originally, she had been promised Godhood but had instead been turned into a scapegoat to fight against to unite the three realms. Jiang Ziya attempts to save the girl, while the Master sends a guillotine to kill her. Jiang Ziya realises his true powers come from his self-confidence and not the will of heaven, and manages to seemingly save the girl, only for her to be killed by the guillotine. The Heavens applaud Jiang Ziya for killing the fox spirit and once again ask him to ascend to godhood. Realizing how corrupt heaven truly is, Jiang Ziya destroys the bridge between the human and heavenly realms, severing the hold between the two.

Years later, Shen Gongbao tells the story of Jiang Ziya to a disciple, framing him as a true hero above all others. A young girl and a dog, reincarnations of Xiao Jiu and Si Bu Xiang respectively, play together.

In a Mid-credits scene, three gods are posted to guard a heavenly prison. In another, Jiang Ziya has dinner with Nezha. In an End-credits scene, the film Deep Sea is teased.

Cast 
 Zheng Xi as Jiang Ziya
 Yang Ning as Xiao Jiu / Su Daji
 Tutehameng as Shen Gongbao
 Yan Meme as Si Bu Xiang
 Ji Guanlin and Shan Xin as Jiuwei / Demon Queen
 Jiang Guangtao as Tianzun

Production

Inspiration 
The film tells the story of the mythological and fictional literary version of Jiang Ziya from the Investiture of the Gods, a gargantuan Ming-dynasty (1368–1644) shenmo novel that is traditionally attributed to Xu Zhonglin, and incorporates various existing myths into a wider narrative.  Jiang Ziya is traditionally depicted in Chinese fiction as a Taoist adept in Chinese folk religion and Taoism.  In this film, Jiang Ziya is portrayed as a middle-aged man who insists on following his heart despite having a complex past.

Release 
On 12 December 2019, the producers released their first trailer.

Due to the COVID-19 pandemic, the film's mainland Chinese release date was changed from 25 January 2020 to 1 October 2020.

The film was released on that date simultaneously in China, the United States, Canada, the United Kingdom, Australia, New Zealand, and Singapore.

Reception

Box office 
In China, pre-sale tickets totaled up to 90 million yuan (US$13.3 million). In just eight hours since its release, the film has grossed a total of 297 million yuan (US$43.7 million). The film surpassed its predecessor, Ne Zha (144 million yuan, or US$21.2 million) to become the highest grossing animated film opening day in China (308 million yuan, US$45.4 million). the film legged out fairly well, dropping to $303 million CNY on its second day, and $115 million CNY by its fifth, ending up with $1.037 billion CNY by the end of its first week. The film ended up with $1.6 billion CNY ($240 million USD), making it the second highest-grossing Chinese animated film ever, and the highest grossing animated film of 2020.

Critical response

The film holds a 6.6 and an 8.3 out of 10 on aggregator sites Douban and Maoyan respectively.

References

External links 

 
 
 
 

2020 films
2020 computer-animated films
Chinese 3D films
Chinese computer-animated films
Chinese fantasy films
Films based on Chinese myths and legends
Films based on Chinese novels
Films postponed due to the COVID-19 pandemic
Films set in the Shang dynasty
IMAX films
2020s Mandarin-language films
Works based on Investiture of the Gods
Films directed by Li Wei (Chinese director)
Animated feature films